Significantly viewed signals permitted to be carried  or Significantly Viewed list (SV) is a federal law permitting television stations as determined by the Federal Communications Commission (FCC), to be carried by cable and other MVPD providers outside of an assigned Nielsen designated market area (DMA). The legislation was passed to help protect viewers living in areas near market boundaries from losing local television stations that have significant viewership from outside of their market. Additionally, the law also allows for carriage of local foreign stations in markets along international borders.

History

In 2005, the FCC completed a federal study on the media markets in the United States. Using the data, the FCC created a list of counties in each state where out-of-market television stations are significantly viewed by residents who are using antennas. Whether or not they are cable or satellite subscribers were not deemed important in their study. The study also looked at the history of viewership of the original Community Access Television (CATV) installations throughout the country, the predecessor of Cable television. Today's cable television content is more focused on premium channel television programming than the original purpose of picking up local programming from television stations in a specific area.

Due to the advancement of digital cable in the 2010s, cable providers such as Comcast and Time Warner Cable (now Spectrum) begun removing out-of-market television stations from basic cable lineups. This was done by cable providers to preserve bandwidth usage, but also to eliminate redundant network affiliates, and to fulfill federal mandates to keep in-DMA local affiliates. Some cable providers, with out-of-market and redundant affiliate stations in the past, moved the out-of-market stations to digital cable channels 100 and above and in the majority of cases, were not transmitted in high definition to allow in-market affiliates the prestige of carrying the programming as intended by their networks rather than the 4:3 cut seen on standard definition feeds. Many cable providers nationwide did not implement this, since they removed distant stations entirely from the cable lineup. This led to some controversy in some parts of the country.  The comments against the removals have mainly occurred in significantly viewed counties that are bordering nearby television markets.

Significantly viewed channel preservation and CATV
Two examples of the SV channel preservation on digital cable and at the same time, CATV favoring a non-designated DMA is Belvidere, New Jersey along the Delaware River. Phillipsburg, Milford, Frenchtown, and Lambertville, all downstream on the Delaware River, sometimes lean towards this as well. Belvidere used to lean towards the Philadelphia market solely on television reception since it was not able to receive New York City area stations. However, since it is located in Warren County, it is officially part of the New York City television market. When cable providers advanced with premium programming and later digital cable service, the Philadelphia stations disappeared from basic cable tiers but KYW-TV, WCAU, and WTXF-TV were later moved to the digital cable tier.

Redundant affiliates
An example of redundant affiliates serving the same area is Harrisonburg, Virginia. The Harrisonburg DMA consists of two Virginia counties and one West Virginia county. Comcast's Harrisonburg system carries two ABC affiliates (in-market affiliate WHSV-TV and Richmond station WRIC-TV), four NBC affiliates (WVIR out of Charlottesville, WRC-TV out of Washington, D.C., WSLS out of Roanoke, and WWBT out of Richmond), two CBS affiliates (WUSA out of Washington, D.C. and WTVR out of Richmond), and two Fox affiliates (WHSV's second digital subchannel and WTTG out of Washington, D.C.).

The Harrisonburg market has only one station for PBS (in-market member station WVPT); the market's other network affiliates are WHSV's MyNetworkTV-affiliated third digital subchannel and a CW-affiliated subchannel of WVIR. Prior to 2006, many of these stations were on the same basic cable tier but were dropped to preserve bandwidth and eliminate the redundancy of multiple affiliates. All of the stations that were not mentioned in the basic cable tier have since been moved over to digital cable.

Most of Detroit's signals penetrate into the Toledo market and traditionally have been carried on Buckeye Broadband. This is similar in situation to Baltimore (which is close to Philadelphia and Washington, D.C.) and Topeka (which is within range of Kansas City's television stations).

A significantly viewed, redundant affiliate may be invaluable to a cable television company in a carriage dispute if it has the same network but different local owners.

Controversy
An example of controversy over residents losing a long-time out-of-market affiliate station occurred in Lumberton, North Carolina. For decades, the city has been reliant for NBC coverage from WECT out of Wilmington, North Carolina. Lumberton has been in and out of different DMAs between the Raleigh, Wilmington, and Florence–Myrtle Beach markets. It is currently in the Florence–Myrtle Beach market since the late 1990s. Parts of the market over-the-air or on cable received a different NBC affiliate, whether it was WIS (Columbia, South Carolina), WECT (Wilmington), WCNC (Charlotte), or WCBD (Charleston, South Carolina).

The Florence–Myrtle Beach market received its own NBC affiliate in August 2008, when Raycom Media built and signed on WMBF. On the day WMBF launched, cable providers were required to drop sister stations WECT and WIS from cable systems in the market. Lumberton residents who subscribed to Time Warner Cable protested the move and pushed to get WECT back on the cable channel lineup; by coincidence, WMBF, WECT, and WIS were all owned by Raycom, thus the removal would in effect promote WMBF within the home market over its out-of-market sister stations. This was also in addition to the fact that WMBF's over-the-air signal does not even reach the North Carolina side of the Florence–Myrtle Beach market. On December 1, 2008, WECT returned to Time Warner Cable's Lumberton service area on a digital cable tier.

See also
Must-carry
Retransmission consent
Satellite Home Viewer Act
Cable television in the United States
Digital cable
Syndex

References

External links
 FCC list of significantly viewed stations
 FCC Media Bureau links to significantly viewed list

Television in the United States
United States communications regulation
Broadcast law